The 3rd Fighter Aviation Division was a formation of the Chinese People's Liberation Army Air Force (PLAAF).  Initially established in 1950. PLAAF fighter divisions generally consist of about 17,000 personnel and 70-120 aircraft. The division is currently headquartered in Wuhu Air Base, Anhui. 

The 3rd Division is considered the most elite division in the PLAAF.

Until 2017, the 9th Brigade was known as the 1st Flying Brigade of the 9th Regiment of the 3rd Fighter Aviation Division, at which time the division was abolished and the surviving 7th, 8th, and 9th regiments beneath it were reorganized into independent fighter brigades. Thus the 9th Fighter Brigade was established.

Notable Members 
Wang Hai
Fan Wanzhang
Sun Shenglu
Zhao Baotong
Liu Yudi
Zhang Jianping

References

See also
 People's Liberation Army Air Force
 People's Liberation Army
 List of Chinese aircraft
 List of Airbases in the PLAAF

Aviation Divisions of the People's Liberation Army
Fighter aircraft units and formations of the People's Republic of China
Military units and formations established in 1950
Military units and formations disestablished in the 2010s
1950 establishments in China
2010s disestablishments in China